The 2003 FIBA Africa Championship for Women was the 16th FIBA Africa Championship for Women, played under the rules of FIBA, the world governing body for basketball, and the FIBA Africa thereof. The tournament was hosted by Mozambique from December 18 to 28, with the games played at the Pavilhão do Maxaquene in Maputo and in Nampula.

Nigeria defeated Mozambique 69–63 in the final to win their first title. and securing a spot at the 2004 Summer Olympics.

Squads

Draw

Preliminary round 
Times given below are in UTC+2.

Group A

Group B

Knockout stage

9th place match

7th place match

5th place match

Semifinals bracket

Semifinals

Bronze medal match

Final

Final standings

Nigeria rosterAisha Mohammed, Funmilayo Ojelabi, Linda Ogugua, Mfon Udoka, Mactabene Amachree, Nguveren Iyorhe, Nwamaka Adibeli, Patricia Chukwuma, Rashidat Sadiq, Coach: Sam Vincent

Awards

All-Tournament Team

See also
 2003 FIBA Africa Women's Clubs Champions Cup

External links
Official Website

References

2003
2003 in women's basketball
2003 in African basketball
Bask
International women's basketball competitions hosted by Mozambique